New Zealand women's cricket team toured South Africa in October 2016. The tour consisted of a series of seven One day internationals and a warm-up match. Three of the seven WODIs were part of the ongoing 2014–16 ICC Women's Championship.

The third match of the series was the 1,000th women's ODI match. New Zealand won the series 5–2.

Squads

Tour match

One day: South Africa Emerging Players Women vs New Zealand Women

ODI series

1st ODI

2nd ODI

3rd ODI

4th ODI

5th ODI

6th ODI

7th ODI

References

External links
 Series Home on ESPN

2014–16 ICC Women's Championship
South Africa 2016
Women's international cricket tours of South Africa
2016 in South African cricket
2016 in women's cricket
2016 in South African women's sport
cricket
International cricket competitions in 2016–17